is a Japanese manga series written and illustrated by Natsumi Itsuki. Set in the modern era, the story follows the path to romance of fourteen-year-old Kajika Burnsworth, daughter of powerful industrialist Harry Burnsworth, owner of the Burnsworth international conglomerate giant. Kajika agrees to participate in a "marriage game" with her father, in which she must select her future husband out of three men that her father has supposedly preselected for her.

Despite its shōjo-romance undertones, the story itself evolves as a power political mystery involving a small, southeast Asian country called Raginei (purportedly near Malaysia). Raginei as a country is only 1,000 years old, but became extremely wealthy within the last 50 years or so due to a change in ideals implemented by past King Machaty that allowed the international export of oil. While Kajika searches for her suitors and puzzles over the concept of love, the country is thrown into political turmoil and Kajika's friendship with Prince Rumatti Ivan, as well as the Burnsworth relationship with Raginei, lands her right in the middle of it all.

Plot

Fourteen-year-old Kajika Burnsworth, daughter of powerful industrialist Harry Burnsworth, has spent the first part of her life living on an island in the Caribbean with a snow leopard named Mustafa. She is finally sent off to school in Japan, but is called away to her father's home in New York very soon after.

While there, Kajika gets talked into the "marriage game" by her father. In this game, she has to meet and choose a possible future husband out of three males that her father has supposedly handpicked. He does not, however, tell her details regarding their identities and leaves it to Kajika to discover the bachelors on her own. According to the rules, if she picks one of the three men, Harry will tell Kajika her true destiny. Her childhood friend, Li Ren Huang, is charged with helping her on her mission while protecting her as her guardian. As leader of the powerful Huang family, Li Ren is most qualified for the task, though whether Li Ren is comfortable with helping Kajika find a husband remains to be seen.

She first meets Eugene Alexandre De Volkan, a beautiful man whom she calls Mustafa because of his uncanny resemblance to the now dead snow leopard she once loved. Second is Prince Rumaty Ivan of Raginei, though Kajika takes a while to decide whether Rumaty is, in fact, one of the men her father selected for her. The third bachelor Kajika meets is Carl Rosenthal of the Rosenthal family and corporation, a Burnsworth competitor. Carl's father hates Harry Burnsworth, to the point where he becomes obsessed with discrediting him. Carl, on the other hand, finds room to be more forgiving, especially with the developing friendship between himself and the gentle, understanding Kajika Burnsworth. All three men are unique in their own ways and Kajika ends up liking each of them very much. As such, she does her best to make all of them a part of her life.

Meanwhile, nearly a year after meeting Prince Rumaty, his country plummets into political turmoil and the King dies. Prince Rumaty is blamed for the King's death, despite his presence in another country during the event and he is banned from returning Raginei under the threat of death. Harry Burnsworth shelters Rumaty, leaving him in the care of Li Leng, who becomes somewhat of a tutor of diplomacy to him. The Prince grows up during his two years at the Burnsworth estate and eventually makes his move to re-enter the country and bring things back under control.

Kajika, Li Ren, Eugene, and Carl Rosenthal get caught up in the country's troubles and all four of them are trapped within its borders when chaos breaks out. Li Ren is injured during a coup d'état battle at the airport and he and Kajika are both sheltered by a Rumaty-supporting faction led by Isaac Noei, once a high-ranking officer in the Royal guard. No one is safe from danger. Officials are murdered, elite families are arrested, priests are framed, and even Noei's hideout is raided.

Two pivotal events occur in Raginei that bring the story to climax. It is during the events in Raginei that Kajika realizes which man she loves most. Also, by the time Prince Rumaty reaches Raginei, Kajika's destiny is revealed to her and the "marriage game" is thus over.

Characters

Protagonists and supporting characters 
 
 Kajika Louisa Kugami Burnsworth is the main protagonist and she is the sole daughter of World-renowned Burnsworth Corporation's owner, Harry Burnsworth. She inherited her father's charisma, and currently lives an uninhibited lifestyle. However, from the time she was very young, she lived on a solitary island in the Caribbean for about ten years. Since she grew up in isolation, Kajika often lacks common knowledge about the world, and always becomes fascinated with her surroundings. Her Japanese mother died when she tried to protect Kajika from getting kidnapped. She makes her first appearance at age fourteen. 

  Lee Leng Huang (倣 立人（ファン・リーレン）)
In exchange for Lee Leng becoming Kajika's watchdog for the duration of the "husband game", Harry offers Lee Leng a stronger business relationship between Burnsworth and Huang. Lee Leng is also asked to give Harry his opinions on each candidate and Kajika's feelings towards them. Lee Leng accepts the verbal contract for the sake of the Fang Group, despite his feelings for Kajika. In the past, Lee Leng had always acted like a big brother to Kajika. Both had known each other since they were children, Lee Leng visiting the island where Kajika lived 2-3 times a year for the past 10 years.  

 
 Toranosuke V Haga is Kajika's baby-faced second generation Japanese-American bodyguard. He is very skilled at his job, but he is very docile and has a somewhat childish personality. He makes his first appearance at age seventeen. 

 
 Harry Burnsworth is Kajika's father. He naturally developed his own company, and is a charismatic industrialist that owns a first generation international conglomerate. There is a grave secret regarding his birth. His father may be Prince Mahaty as mentioned in episode 11 by Kathleen, with Fred asking if he could raise her and Mahaty's child as its father. Harry later confessed to Lee Leng that his father is Prince Mahaty.

Burnsworth relatives 
 
 Frederick Burnsworth is Harry's foster father, and Kajika's foster grandfather. His nickname is Fred, and he is a novelist. He is a Great Friend of Mahaty Sheik. Older: , Younger: 

 
 Kathleen Burnsworth is Harry's mother, and Kajika's grandmother. She passes away three years before Kajika visits Fred's house for the first time. Older: , Younger:

Kajika's husband candidates 
 
 Eugene Alenxandr de Volkan is descended from French nobility and is the third son of the Volkan corporation. As a rare beauty possessing emerald green eyes and platinum blond hair, Eugene often catches the attention of many women. However, Eugene is suicidal, and often toys with the emotions of these women in an attempt to get them to take his life. Sadly, he has driven many women to suicide as they can not bear to harm him. After having the will to live with Kajika's help, he frequently helps out. He loves Kajika; he says that he will do anything if Kajika orders him. Eugene also says if Kajika chooses a man to love, he will accept it even if his sorrow consumes him. Kajika views Eugene as the reincarnation of her pet leopard Mustafa, Kajika takes an instant liking to him. 

 
 Rumaty Ivan Di Raginei is the second prince of the Raginei kingdom, which was able to rapidly expand thanks to an abundant natural supply of oil. Resembling his grandfather Machaty in personality, Rumaty is next in line for the crown after his elder brother. Coincidentally, his eyes and face closely resemble that of Kajika. In episode 21 it is revealed that he is Kajika's cousin, for Harry and Woold are half-brothers. Rumaty matures as the series progresses. He develops romantic feelings for Kajika. 

 
 Carl Rosenthal is a son to a competing corporation of the Burnsworth enterprise and therefore a third husband candidate in Kajika's game with her father. He is claustrophobic because when he was six years old he fell in a well. Carl falls in love with Kajika and says it feels comfortable around her.

Raginei Kingdom 
 Mahaty Sheik Di Raginei
 Mahaty Sheik Di Raginei is the former king of Raginei kingdom and grandfather of Rumaty. He is now resigned after passing the throne to Woold, Rumaty and Somand's father. 

 
 Quinza Hafez is a sharp and able chamberlain who serves Rumaty. He sees qualities of a king in Rumaty who is the second son of the current king and second in line for the throne. As such, he is scheming to instigate a bloody uprising in the Raginei kingdom with the intent of making Rumaty king. 

 
 Isaac Noei is an officer of the Raginei kingdom's imperial guard. When he first appeared in the anime, he was a lieutenant, but gets promoted to captain later on. 

 
 Sezun Hafez is Rumaty's sole attendant, and Quinza's younger brother. 

 
 Najayra is the princess of Raginei kingdom, and is the cousin of Rumaty and Izmail. 

 
 Izmal is a prince of Raginei kingdom, and is Najayra's and Rumaty's cousin. 

 
 Somand is the crown prince of the Raginei kingdom, and is Rumaty's elder brother.

Huang family  
 
 Monchen Zao is a close associate and advisor to Li Leng. The Zaos have served the Huang family for generations, but Monchen did not intend to do so as well at first. However, upon meeting the young Li Leng, he decided to follow the Huang family as Li Leng's servant. 

 
 Tonsen Huang is the 5th senior executive of the Huang corporation, and is critical of the Burnsworth corporation and the newly appointed Li Leng.

Other characters 
 
 Yui Yamate is one of Kajika's classmates from when she was an international exchange student at a Japanese high school. After certain incidents occur, she becomes friends with Kajika. 

 
 Eddy Roberts is a freelance journalist. He has been acquainted with Eugene for quite some time, and uses this to get close to Kajika and her friends. One year after Rumaty is chased out of his country, he is successful in getting the sole interview from him. 

 Alain
 

 
 Dong-Xuan Huang is Li Leng's uncle. 

 
 Bridget Huang is Li Leng's aunt and Dong Xuan's wife. She had an incestuous relationship with Li Leng in the past and is jealous of Kajika.

 Leon
 Another lover of Bridget Huang.

Media

Manga

Hanasakeru Seishōnen is written and illustrated by Natsumi Itsuki. The manga was serialized in Hakusensha's shōjo magazine (aimed at teenage girls), LaLa from February 24, 1987 to March 24, 1987 and again from August 24, 1989 and August 24, 1994.

Anime

The manga was adapted into an anime by Studio Pierrot. Directed by Chiaki Kon, the anime aired between April 5, 2009 to February 14, 2010 on NHK. The anime has been licensed by Discotek Media for a Blu-ray release to come in November 24, 2020.

Stage
Hanasakeru Seishōnen has also been made into a stageplay. The first one is, besides Hanasakeru Seishōnen, also named The Budding Beauty and the second The Budding Beauty in The Oriental Blue Wind.Consta de 39 capítulos

References

External links

Official Studio Pierrot Anime Website 
Official NHK Anime Website 
Official Hakusensha manga Site 
Shelf Life review
ANN anime review
Official Stage Website 

1987 manga
2010 Japanese television series endings
Anime series based on manga
Discotek Media
Drama anime and manga
Hakusensha franchises
Hakusensha manga
Natsumi Itsuki
NHK original programming
Pierrot (company)
Romance anime and manga
Shōjo manga